Dmitri Gennadyevich Kostrov (born 5 August 1981) is a Russian former professional footballer.

Club career
He made his debut in the Russian Premier League in 2000 for FC Rotor Volgograd.

References

1981 births
People from Nekhayevsky District
Living people
Russian footballers
Association football defenders
FC Rotor Volgograd players
FC Volgar Astrakhan players
FC Olimpia Volgograd players
FC Dynamo Bryansk players
Russian Premier League players
Sportspeople from Volgograd Oblast